Matthew Street (born 17 December 1978) is a South African cricketer. He played nineteen first-class and five List A matches between 1999 and 2004. He was also part of South Africa's squad for the 1998 Under-19 Cricket World Cup.

References

External links
 

1978 births
Living people
South African cricketers
Gauteng cricketers
Cricketers from Johannesburg